Terri E. Givens (born 1964) is an author and political scientist.  Givens is a professor at McGill University.

Research and service
Givens' research has focused on immigration politics and antidiscrimination policy at the national level in Britain, France and Germany, Belgium, and the Netherlands, policy developments at the European Union level.

At McGill University, Givens is leading an effort to hire and retain more Black professors.

Selected publications

Awards and fellowships
Fellow, Kolleg-Forschergruppe “Transformative Power of Europe,” Freie Universitaet, Berlin, Germany, 2010-2018 
Public Policy Scholar, Woodrow Wilson International Center for Scholars, Washington, D.C., 2012.
Visiting Scholar, Centre d’Etudes et de Recherches Internationales, Sciences-Po, Paris, France, 2010.
Distinguished Scholar Alumni from Stanford University, 2010.

External links

Terri Givens Official Website

References 

American women political scientists
American political scientists
University of California, Los Angeles alumni
1964 births
Living people
American women non-fiction writers
McGill University
21st-century American women writers